The 12th Maxim Cup began on 2 November 2010 and concluded on 5 April 2011. Pak Yeong-hun defeated Lee Chang-ho 2–0 in the final.

Tournament

References

2011 in go
Go competitions in South Korea